Asura andamana is a moth of the  family Erebidae. It is found on the Andamans.

References

andamana
Moths described in 1877
Moths of Asia